The following is a list of awards and nominations received by American actress, playwright, producer, screenwriter, and director Greta Gerwig.

In 2011, Gerwig won an award from the Athena Film Festival for her artistry as one of Hollywood's definitive screen actresses of her generation. In 2014, she was selected as a member of the jury for the 64th Berlin International Film Festival.

In 2018, her nomination for Best Director at the 90th Academy Awards for Lady Bird made her the first woman in eight years (and one of only five women in Oscar history) to have been nominated in that category. Gerwig's work on Lady Bird was nominated for sixteen awards in notable circuits, winning six of those awards.

Awards and nominations

AACTA International Awards

Academy Awards

Alliance of Women Film Journalists

Austin Film Critics Association

Boston Society of Film Critics

British Academy Film Awards

Chicago Film Critics Association

Critics' Choice Movie Awards

Dallas–Fort Worth Film Critics Association

Detroit Film Critics Society

Directors Guild of America Award

Dorian Awards

Dublin Film Critics' Circle

Florida Film Critics Circle

Georgia Film Critics Association

Golden Globe Awards

Gotham Independent Film Awards

Hollywood Critics Association

Houston Film Critics Society

Independent Spirit Awards

IndieWire Critics Poll

International Cinephile Society

London Film Critics' Circle

Los Angeles Online Film Critics Society

National Board of Review

National Society of Film Critics

Online Film Critics Society

San Diego Film Critics Society

San Francisco Film Critics Circle

Satellite Awards

Seattle Film Critics Society

St. Louis Film Critics Association

Toronto Film Critics Association

Vancouver Film Critics Circle

Washington D.C. Area Film Critics Association

Women Film Critics Circle

Writers Guild of America Awards

References

External links
 

Lists of awards received by American actor
Lists of awards received by film director
Lists of awards received by writer